Makhan Lal Singla is a former member of the Haryana Legislative Assembly that represented the constituency of Sirsa. At present, he is associated with BJP.

References 

Living people
Members of the Haryana Legislative Assembly
Indian National Lok Dal politicians
1949 births